"Thirmida" venusta is a moth of the family Notodontidae first described by Paul Dognin in 1900. It is found in Ecuador.

Taxonomy
The species does not belong in Thirmida in the tribe Josiini. It could potentially belong in Brachyglene or Nebulosa.

References

Moths described in 1900
Notodontidae of South America